Dave Foley (born 16 May 1988) is an Irish rugby union player for French side Pau in the Top 14 and European Rugby Challenge Cup. He plays as a lock.

Munster
Foley made his Munster debut against Connacht in April 2010. His first start for Munster was against Benetton Treviso in February 2011. A dislocated shoulder sustained in a Pro12 game against Newport Gwent Dragons on 3 March 2012 ruled Foley out for 'a while'. He signed a one-year contract extension with Munster in March 2012. In January 2013, Foley signed a further contract extension with Munster. Foley was ruled out for 3 months with a wrist injury in January 2015. He returned form the injury on 5 September 2015. On 16 March 2017, it was confirmed that Foley required a second wrist surgery.

Pau
On 21 March 2017, it was announced that Foley would joining French Top 14 side Pau at the beginning of the 2017–18 season. In making the move, Foley joined ex-Munster teammates Paddy Butler and Sean Dougall and former Munster backs coach Simon Mannix at the club.

Ireland
Foley was named in the Emerging Ireland squad to take part in the 2013 IRB Tbilisi Cup on 19 May 2013. He started against Georgia in Emerging Ireland's first game of the tournament on 7 June 2013. Foley also started in Emerging Ireland' second game, a 19–8 defeat to South Africa President's XV on 11 June 2013. He started Emerging Ireland 42–33 final game victory against Uruguay on 16 June 2013. Foley was  again selected in the Emerging Ireland squad when it was announced on 26 May 2014. He started against Russia in their first 2014 IRB Nations Cup match on 13 June 2014. Foley came off the bench in their second game against Uruguay on 18 June 2014. He started in the 31–10 win Romania on 22 June 2014, a win that secured the 2014 IRB Nations Cup for Emerging Ireland.

Foley was named in the Ireland squad for the 2014 Guinness Series on 21 October 2014. Foley made his senior debut for Ireland on 16 November 2014, starting in the 49–7 win against Georgia and earning the Man-of-the-Match award. He also came on in the 26–23 win against Australia on 22 November 2014. On 22 February 2016, Foley was named in Ireland's squad for the 2016 Six Nations Championship fixture against England. He was called-up as an injury replacement for Mike McCarthy.

Honours

Emerging Ireland
World Rugby Tbilisi Cup
Runner-Up (1): (2013)
World Rugby Nations Cup
Winner (1): (2014)

References

External links
Munster Profile
Ireland Profile
Ireland U20 Profile

Living people
1988 births
People educated at CBS High School Clonmel
Alumni of the University of Limerick
Rugby union players from County Tipperary
Irish rugby union players
UL Bohemians R.F.C. players
Munster Rugby players
Ireland international rugby union players
Section Paloise players
Rugby union locks
Irish expatriate rugby union players
Irish expatriate sportspeople in France
Expatriate rugby union players in France